Jason Raynard Peters (born January 22, 1982) is an American football offensive tackle for the Dallas Cowboys of the National Football League (NFL). He played college football at Arkansas and signed with the Buffalo Bills as an undrafted free agent in 2004, originally as a tight end. He was later traded to the Philadelphia Eagles in 2009 and spent the next twelve seasons playing for them before joining the Chicago Bears in 2021, and more recently in 2022, the Dallas Cowboys.

College career
After starring in both football and basketball at Queen City High School (TX), Peters attended the University of Arkansas and played for the Arkansas Razorbacks football team. Originally recruited as a defensive tackle, he spent his freshman campaign as a reserve defensive lineman. He was then moved to the tight end spot, where he caught four passes for 37 yards as a sophomore. In his junior season, Peters registered 21 catches for 218 yards and four touchdowns, which earned him a second-team All-SEC selection.

Professional career

2004 NFL Draft
A fairly athletic tight end at more than 320 pounds, Peters was seen as "a clone of former Denver Broncos giant Orson Mobley." Since he registered far more knockdown blocks (61) than catches (21) in his last year in college, Peters spent much time prior to the 2004 NFL Draft working O-line drills, preparing himself to be an offensive tackle for the NFL. He was projected as an early fourth round pick by Sports Illustrated, but eventually went undrafted.

Buffalo Bills
Peters was picked up by the Buffalo Bills as an undrafted rookie free agent in April 2004. He was cut then re-signed to the Bills' practice squad. He was signed to the active roster on November 12, 2004. Peters made his mark on special teams as a wedge buster on kickoffs and as a blocking tight end, while beginning to learn to play offensive tackle under the tutelage of offensive line coach Jim McNally.

In 2006, Peters beat out former Texas star Mike Williams for starting right tackle on the Bills. Peters was rewarded for his play, signing a 5-year, $15 million contract extension with the Bills in the offseason. In 2007, Peters began the season entrenched as the starting right tackle. After Week 7, the Bills reshuffled their offensive line to better protect quarterback J. P. Losman. Peters was moved to left tackle, replacing Mike Gandy who moved inside to left guard.

After the 2006 season, Sports Illustrated's Paul Zimmerman debated selecting Peters to his All-Pro team. "I was rooting for the Bills' Jason Peters, whom I would have loved to pick, but he isn't there yet. Very athletic, but not enough of a roughneck."
 Peters allowed only two sacks in that season and was not called for a holding penalty.

In 2007, Peters saw his best years as a pro, and was selected to start at left tackle on the AFC Pro-Bowl team. As offensive line coach Jim McNally put it, "His ability is limitless." He injured his groin in a game against the New York Giants, and was unable to attend the Pro Bowl game. He was the first Bills offensive lineman to make the Pro Bowl since Ruben Brown in 2003. Joe Thomas was selected to replace him in the Pro Bowl.

At the beginning of the 2008 offseason Peters was unhappy with his contract and did not report to any of the Bills offseason workouts including the teams' mandatory minicamps. Head Coach Dick Jauron said that he would be fined and would even be taken out of the lineup if he did not show. Peters reportedly wanted a contract between $8 million and $11.5 million per season in a contract extension. On July 25, 2008, the NFL Network's Adam Schefter reported Peters would not report to the Bills' training camp at  Saint John Fisher College in Pittsford, N.Y. Schefter also said Peters was willing to sit out the entire season to get a new and improved contract. On August 20, 2008, training camp for the Bills came to an end with Peters being absent for the whole camp and all of the preseason games. On September 5, 2008, Peters ended his holdout and returned to the Buffalo Bills. Peters was fined over $560,000 for missing all of training camp, but if he had missed a regular season game, he would have been fined $191,000 for each game he missed.

Peters was selected as the starting left tackle in the Pro Bowl and was a Second-team All-Pro although his 2008 season was subpar and some thought the Pro Bowl selection was dubious. In 2006, he allowed only two sacks and allowed six sacks in 2007.

Philadelphia Eagles
Peters had been unhappy with his contract and had not been attending the Bills’ offseason activities after staging a holdout in 2008 during training camp. On April 17, 2009, the Buffalo Bills traded Peters to the Philadelphia Eagles and received their first round pick (28th overall, used to select center Eric Wood) and fourth round pick (121st overall, used to select tight end Shawn Nelson) in the 2009 NFL Draft and a conditional sixth round pick in the 2010 NFL Draft (used to select linebacker Danny Batten).

On April 17, 2009, the Philadelphia Eagles announced they had signed Peters to a six-year, $60 million contract for him to remain in Philadelphia through 2014. The Eagles opted to void Peters' previous contract he signed with the Bills that had two years remaining. Head coach Andy Reid added, "Jason Peters is the best left tackle in football. He is a powerful and athletic tackle and I have admired his play over the last few years on film."

Peters was selected to the 2010 Pro Bowl and 2011 Pro Bowl as a starter and was a 2010 second-team All-Pro selection.

On March 28, 2012, Peters ruptured his Achilles tendon during an offseason workout. He ruptured it a second time in May 2012 after the equipment he was using to move around his house malfunctioned. He was placed on the active/non-football injury list on July 22, 2012, before the start of training camp.

On February 26, 2014, Peters signed a new five-year deal worth $51.3 million with the Eagles.

During a game against the Washington Redskins on September 21, 2014, Redskins player Chris Baker took out Eagles Quarterback Nick Foles with an illegal hit. Following the hit, a brawl broke out on the sidelines between both teams. Baker was confronted by Peters, who then took a swing at Baker which resulted in both players getting ejected in the scuffle. On September 27, 2014, Peters was fined $10,000.

On June 14, 2017, Peters signed a one-year contract extension with the Eagles through the 2019 season. On October 23, 2017, during Monday Night Football against the Redskins, Peters left the game with an apparent right knee injury. The next night, it was revealed that his right knee had tears to the ACL and MCL, which ended his 2017 season. The Eagles went on to win Super Bowl LII against the New England Patriots 41–33, giving Peters his first Super Bowl ring.

On March 11, 2019, the Eagles signed Peters on a one-year contract for the 2019 season. On July 17, 2020, Peters signed another one-year contract with the Eagles. He was set to start at right guard following a season-ending injury to Brandon Brooks, but was moved back to left tackle following a season-ending injury to Andre Dillard. He was given a restructured contract after his move to left tackle on September 10, 2020. He was placed on injured reserve on October 3, 2020 with a foot injury. He was activated on October 31, 2020. He was placed back on injured reserve on December 12, 2020, ending his season.

Chicago Bears
On August 16, 2021, Peters signed with the Chicago Bears. He started in 15 out of 17 games for the team.

Dallas Cowboys 
On September 5, 2022, Peters signed with the Dallas Cowboys practice squad. He was promoted to the active roster on September 26.

References

External links

 Chicago Bears bio

1982 births
Living people
African-American players of American football
American Conference Pro Bowl players
American football offensive tackles
American football tight ends
American people of Dutch descent
Arkansas Razorbacks football players
Buffalo Bills players
Chicago Bears players
Dallas Cowboys players
National Conference Pro Bowl players
People from Cass County, Texas
Philadelphia Eagles players
Players of American football from Texas
Unconferenced Pro Bowl players
21st-century African-American sportspeople
20th-century African-American people